John Baylis Earle (October 23, 1766February 3, 1836) was a U.S. Representative from South Carolina, nephew of Elias Earle and cousin of Samuel Earle.

Biography
Born on the North Carolina side of the North Pacolet River, near Landrum, Earle moved to South Carolina. He completed preparatory studies.
He served as a drummer boy and soldier during the Revolutionary War in the Rutherford County Regiment.
He engaged in agricultural pursuits.

Earle was elected as a Democratic-Republican to the Eighth Congress (March 4, 1803 – March 3, 1805).
He was re-elected in 1804, but declined the seat.
He resumed agricultural pursuits.
He served as adjutant and inspector general of South Carolina for sixteen years.
He served throughout the War of 1812.
He served as member of the nullification convention of 1832 and 1833.
He died in Anderson County, South Carolina, February 3, 1836 and was interred in the cemetery on his plantation, "Silver Glade," in Anderson County.

Sources

1766 births
1836 deaths
People from Mecklenburg County, North Carolina
People of South Carolina in the American Revolution
Democratic-Republican Party members of the United States House of Representatives from South Carolina
People from Anderson County, South Carolina